Indonesian Floorball Association (IFA) is the highest floorball governing body in Indonesia. IFA is founded on 28 October 2009. It has been recognized as 51st member (provisional) of IFF in the same year.

IFA was recognized as a full member of the National Sports Committee of Indonesia on June 3, 2016 and a full member of the Indonesian Olympic Committee on February 10, 2017.

National Teams

Citations

External links
 Official IFA page

Floorball in Indonesia
Floorball
Floorball governing bodies
2009 establishments in Indonesia